William Bowser may refer to:
 William John Bowser (1867–1933), politician in British Columbia
 William Charles Bowser (1915–2006), member of the all-black Pea Island Life-Saving Station